Magali Franka (born 24 January 1990 in Lyon, France) is a track and field sprint athlete who competes internationally for the Democratic Republic of the Congo.

Magali represented DR Congo at the 2008 Summer Olympics in Beijing. She competed at the 100 metres sprint and placed eighth in her heat without advancing to the second round. She ran the distance in a time of 12.57 seconds.

References

External links

1990 births
Living people
Democratic Republic of the Congo female sprinters
Olympic athletes of the Democratic Republic of the Congo
Athletes (track and field) at the 2008 Summer Olympics
Athletes from Lyon
French sportspeople of Democratic Republic of the Congo descent
Olympic female sprinters
Black French sportspeople